The Xianshuihe fault system is a major active sinistral (left-lateral) strike-slip fault zone in southwestern China, at the eastern edge of the Tibetan Plateau. It has been responsible for many major earthquakes, and is one of the most seismically active fault zones in this part of China.

Tectonic setting
The Xianshuihe fault system lies within the complex zone of continental collision between the Indian Plate and the Eurasian Plate. It forms one of a set of sinistral fault zones that help accommodate the eastward spreading of the Tibetan Plateau. The fault zone defines the northern and eastern edges of the Sichuan-Yunnan block, and the southeastern boundary of the Bayan Har block.

Geometry
The Xianshuihe fault system comprises several distinct segments, with an overall length of about 350 km. The main segments are the Ganzi (or Ganzi-Yushu), the Xianshuihe, the Anninghe-Zemuhe, and the Xiaojiang faults.

Seismicity
Movements on this fault system have been responsible for many large historical earthquakes, with more than 20 events of magnitude greater than 6.5 since 1700. Some of these earthquakes have formed linked sequences, with each event being triggered by the previous one due to stress changes.

Creep
Like the San Andreas Fault in California, the Xianshuihe exhibits a behavior called  Aseismic creep. The Xianshuihe fault creeps at a rate of a few mm/yr between earthquakes.

Notable earthquakes
 1786 Kangding-Luding earthquake
 1850 Xichang earthquake
 1923 Renda earthquake
 1955 Zheduotang earthquake
 1973 Luhuo earthquake
 1981 Dawu earthquake
 2010 Yushu earthquake
 2022 Luding earthquake

See also
Xianshui River

References

Seismic faults of Asia
Geology of China
Strike-slip faults